Kevin Lyles (born July 23, 1973) is an American former sprinter. He won gold medals with the United States in the 4 × 400-meter relay at the 1993 Summer Universiade and at the 1995 World Championships in Athletics, where he was an alternate runner in the heats stage.

He ran collegiately for Seton Hall where he was the 1993 Big East Indoor Championship's Most Outstanding Track Performer. At national level, he placed sixth in the 400 m at the 1995 USA Outdoor Track and Field Championships. He achieved his personal record of 45.01 seconds that year, which ranked him 15th in the world that season. He ceased competing at top level after the 1997 season.

From Irvington, New Jersey, he married Seton Hall track athlete Keisha Caine. Their children are 2022 World Champion Noah Lyles and 2014 World Junior Champion Josephus Lyles.

International competitions

See also
List of World Championships in Athletics medalists (men)

References

1973 births
Living people
People from Irvington, New Jersey
Track and field athletes from New Jersey
American male sprinters
Seton Hall Pirates men's track and field athletes
World Athletics Championships medalists
World Athletics Championships athletes for the United States
Universiade medalists in athletics (track and field)
Universiade gold medalists for the United States
Athletes (track and field) at the 1995 Pan American Games
World Athletics Championships winners
Medalists at the 1993 Summer Universiade
Pan American Games track and field athletes for the United States